Cymatopus is a genus of flies in the family Dolichopodidae.

Species

Cymatopus capensis Parent, 1939 is a synonym of Cemocarus griseatus (Curran, 1926), the type species of Cemocarus.

References

Dolichopodidae genera
Hydrophorinae
Taxa named by Kálmán Kertész